More Friends is the second studio album by Japanese idol singer Erina Mano. Released on November 24, 2010 in Japan under the label Hachama, under Hello! Project, the album is produced by Taisei (たいせい), former member of the group Sharam Q, and reached the 32nd place of Oricon. It also comes in a limited edition with a different cover and a DVD containing extra clips, movie listing and "making-of".

It contains five songs previously released as singles in 2009 and 2010: "Love & Peace = Paradise", "Haru no Arashi", "Onegai Dakara" and "Genkimono de Ikō!" in another version (and "B-side" Uchi e Kaerō; also in another version in the album), the latter two in revised versions for the album.

Track listing

References 

2010 albums
Erina Mano albums